Sir Kenneth Berrill  (28 August 1920 – 30 April 2009) was an English economist and public servant.

Early life and education
Born at Stoke Newington, London, Berrill was the son Stanley Ernest Berrill (1896–1984), a clerk at a men's outfitters, and Lilian May (née Blakeley). He won a scholarship to University College London to train as a geography teacher, working at Romford greyhound stadium in the evenings. He subsequently transferred to the London School of Economics, where he read economics, taking a degree in 1941, then served in the Royal Electrical and Mechanical Engineers during World War II. He returned to LSE, completing an MA in 1949.

Career
After taking his MA, Berrill was a fellow and bursar at St Catharine's College, Cambridge, moving in 1962 to King's, where he remained until 1969. At this time, he was developing a reputation as an economic adviser, including for the World Bank, OECD, and for overseas governments. In 1967, he was appointed a special adviser to the Treasury.

Throughout his career, he held a number of posts including chief economic adviser to the Treasury in the closing months of Edward Heath's premiership, and head of the Central Policy Review Staff from 1974 to 1980 and the chairmanship of the Securities and Investments Board until 1988. He was awarded an Honorary Degree (Doctor of Laws) by the University of Bath in 1974.

In 1950, he was member of an Anglo-Swiss expedition which was the first to climb Abi Gamin.

In 1981, he became the senior partner of the prominent City stockbroking firm of Vickers da Costa.

Personal life
In 1941, Berrill married Brenda West, with whom he had a son; he married secondly, in 1950, June Phillips, with whom he had a son and a daughter, and married thirdly, in 1977, Jane Marris.

References

External links
 Sir Kenneth Berrill (Telegraph obituary)
 Lives remembered: Sir Kenneth Berrill…

1920 births
2009 deaths
English economists
English civil servants
Alumni of the London School of Economics
Alumni of University College London
Fellows of Trinity College, Cambridge
Fellows of King's College, Cambridge
Knights Grand Cross of the Order of the British Empire
Knights Commander of the Order of the Bath
English mountain climbers
Fellows of King's College London
British Army personnel of World War II
Royal Electrical and Mechanical Engineers soldiers